Río Bravo Municipality is one of the municipalities of Tamaulipas. The seat is at Río Bravo, Tamaulipas.

Towns and villages

The largest localities (cities, towns, and villages) are:

Adjacent municipalities and counties

 Matamoros Municipality - northeast and southeast
 Valle Hermoso Municipality - east
 San Fernando Municipality - south
 Méndez Municipality - southwest
 Reynosa Municipality - west
 Hidalgo County, Texas - north

References

Municipalities of Tamaulipas